Coptotermes is a genus of termites in the family Rhinotermitidae. Many of the roughly 71 species are economically destructive pests. The genus is thought to have originated in Southeast Asia. Worker termites from this genus forage underground and move about in roofed tunnels that they build along the surface.

In Australia, Coptotermes colonies sometimes host a parasitic genus of termites, Ahamitermes. The host and the parasite dwell in separate parts of the mound nest and are mutually antagonistic. The Ahamitermes species live in the innermost parts of the nest and feed on the "carton" material with which the galleries are lined, which consists of soil particles, chewed wood, and cellulose, bound together with saliva and faeces. They are thus dependent on their hosts for both their food and their home and are not found in any other situations.

Species
This is an incomplete list of species: 
Coptotermes acinaciformis
Coptotermes brunneus
Coptotermes ceylonicus
Coptotermes curvignathus Holmgren
Coptotermes elisae
Coptotermes emersoni
Coptotermes formosanus - Formosan subterranean termite
Coptotermes frenchi
Coptotermes gaurii
Coptotermes gestroi - Asian subterranean termite
Coptotermes havilandi
Coptotermes heimi 
Coptotermes kalshoveni
Coptotermes lacteus
Coptotermes parvulus Holmgren

References

Termite genera